Lat Konar (also Romanized as Lāt Konār) is a village in Goli Jan Rural District, in the Central District of Tonekabon County, Mazandaran Province, Iran. As of the 2006 census, its population was 25, in 7 families.

References 

Populated places in Tonekabon County